Sindre Henriksen (born 24 July 1992) is a Norwegian speed skater.

At the 2017 World Single Distance Speed Skating Championships he won a bronze medal in team pursuit with the Norwegian team, along with Sverre Lunde Pedersen and Simen Spieler Nilsen.

References

External links
 
 
 

1992 births
Norwegian male speed skaters
Sportspeople from Bergen
Living people
Speed skaters at the 2018 Winter Olympics
Olympic speed skaters of Norway
Medalists at the 2018 Winter Olympics
Olympic medalists in speed skating
Olympic gold medalists for Norway
World Single Distances Speed Skating Championships medalists
21st-century Norwegian people